The 1932 Paris–Tours was the 27th edition of the Paris–Tours cycle race and was held on 24 April 1932. The race started in Paris and finished in Tours. The race was won by Julien Moineau.

General classification

References

1932 in French sport
1932
April 1932 sports events